Walmsley is a surname. Notable people with the surname include:

 Anne Walmsley (born 1931), British editor, scholar, critic and author
 David Walmsley, Canadian journalist, editor of The Globe and Mail
 David Walmsley, British actor, known for roles in Ben-Hur (2016) and Slow Horses (2022)
 Emma Walmsley (born 1969), British businesswoman, CEO of GlaxoSmithKline
 Ian Walmsley (born 1960), British physicist
 Jim Walmsley (born 1990), American long-distance runner
 Joan Walmsley (born 1943), British Liberal Democrat politician
 John S. Walmsley Jr. (1920–1951), U.S. Air Force bomber pilot, Medal of Honor recipient
 Jon Walmsley (born 1956), British-American musician and actor
 Joshua Walmsley (1794–1871), English businessman and Liberal Party politician
 Kerry Walmsley (born 1973), New Zealand cricketer
 Leo Walmsley (1892–1966), English writer
 Richard Walmsley (born 1962), English record producer and songwriter, member of the Beatmasters and Goldbug
 Sir Robert Walmsley (1941–2022), Royal Navy admiral, Chief of Defence Procurement at the UK Ministry of Defence
 Syd Walmsley (1896–1973), English rugby league footballer
 Thomas Walmsley (disambiguation)
 Wal Walmsley (1916–1978), Australian cricketer

References

English-language surnames